The women's shot put at the 2018 European Athletics Championships took place at the Olympic Stadium on 7 and 8 August.

Records

Schedule

Results

Qualification
Qualification: 17.20 m (Q) or best 12 performers (q).

Final

References

Shot put W
Shot put at the European Athletics Championships
Euro